Róisín Shortall (born 25 April 1954) is an Irish Social Democrats politician who has been a Teachta Dála (TD) for the Dublin North-West constituency since 1992. She previously was joint leader of the Social Democrats from 2015 to 2023 and served as Minister of State for Primary Care from 2011 to 2012.

A member of the Labour Party until 2012, she sat as an Independent from 2012 to 2015, until she co-founded the Social Democrats in July 2015.

In August 2022, she became the longest serving female TD in the history of the State, overtaking Mary Harney.

In February 2023, she announced that she would stand down as co-leader of the Social Democrats.

Early life
Shortall was born and raised in Drumcondra, Dublin. Her father was a Fianna Fáil Dublin City Councillor who had fought in the Irish Civil War. She was educated at Dominican College, Eccles Street; University College Dublin, and Marino Institute of Education, Marino. She has a B.A. in Economics and Politics. She worked as a teacher for the deaf before seeking public office.

Political career
In 1988, she joined the Labour Party and first held public office in 1991, when she was elected to Dublin City Council for the Drumcondra local electoral area.

Shortall was first elected to Dáil Éireann at the 1992 general election, when the Labour Party won a record 33 seats as part of the "Spring Tide", a surge credited to the popularity of Labour leader Dick Spring. She retained her seat at each of the following four general elections. She is a former party Spokesperson for Social and Family Affairs.

In 1999, she opposed the merger of the Democratic Left into the Labour Party. In 2002, she was openly critical of Labour Party leader Ruairi Quinn following a poor showing by Labour in the 2002 general election. Following Quinn's resignation from the leadership months later, she contested the open leadership position, but lost out to former Democratic Left member Eamonn Gilmore.

On 10 March 2011, she was appointed as Minister of State for Primary Care.

Fianna Fáil and Sinn Féin tabled a motion of no confidence in Minister for Health James Reilly on 3 September 2012, after yet more cuts in the health service. Shortall addressed the Dáil during this motion and did not indicate her support for him or mention his name once, though she did vote against the motion. She resigned as Minister of State for Primary Care on 26 September 2012, and also resigned the Parliamentary Labour Party whip.

Social Democrats
On 15 July 2015, Shortall launched the Social Democrats party along with fellow Independent TDs Stephen Donnelly and Catherine Murphy. She was elected for that party at the 2016 general election and 2020 general election.

In February 2022 Shortall, who is the Social Democrats' spokesperson for Health, introduced a bill in the Dáil to stop the practice of the HSE sending debt collectors to cancer patients in search of payment. The Bill also seeks an end to an inpatient charge of €80 per visit for chemo and radiotherapy, and also seeks to end extortionate parking fees. The government choose not to oppose the bill. Shortall opined that it was “frankly disgusting” that cancer patients were being pursued by debt collectors during one of the most difficult points in their lives. Each of the other opposition parties all praised the content of the bill and similarly expressed their dismay at the idea of debt collectors being used on cancer patients.

On 22 February 2023, Shortall and Murphy announced that they would step down as co-leaders of the Social Democrats.  They were succeeded by Holly Cairns on 1 March.

References

External links

 

1954 births
Living people
Alumni of University College Dublin
Alumni of Marino Institute of Education
Educators of the deaf
Independent TDs
Irish schoolteachers
Labour Party (Ireland) TDs
Local councillors in Dublin (city)
Members of the 27th Dáil
Members of the 28th Dáil
Members of the 29th Dáil
Members of the 30th Dáil
Members of the 31st Dáil
Members of the 32nd Dáil
Members of the 33rd Dáil
20th-century women Teachtaí Dála
21st-century women Teachtaí Dála
Ministers of State of the 31st Dáil
Social Democrats (Ireland) TDs
Women ministers of state of the Republic of Ireland
People from Drumcondra, Dublin